Al Fajr (Arabic الفجر; The Dawn) is an independent Arabic-language daily newspaper published in Abu Dhabi, United Arab Emirates. Founded in 1974 the daily is one of the oldest publications in the country.

History and profile
Al Fajr was launched by Obaid Humaid Al Mazrooei in 1974. Mazrooei was also the first editor of the daily. The publisher of the paper is Dar Al Fajr Printing, Publishing and Advertising which was founded in 1975. The headquarters of the paper is in Abu Dhabi.

The daily, an independent publication, provides local, national and international news. In addition, the paper provides supplements for arts and women.

The newspaper is considered loyalist and pro-government. As of 2013 Sherif Al Bassel was the editor-in-chief of the daily.

The daily is a member of the Audit Bureau of Circulations for its circulation records. The reported circulation of Al Fajr in 1994 was 4,284 copies. Its estimated circulation in 2003 was 28,000 copies.

References

External links

1974 establishments in the United Arab Emirates
Arabic-language newspapers
Mass media in Abu Dhabi
Daily newspapers published in the United Arab Emirates
Publications established in 1974